Thierry Froger (born 21 March 1963) is a French football coach and former player who is the head coach of AS Arta/Solar7.

Playing career
Froger played club football for Le Mans, Lille and Grenoble.

Coaching career

In January 2013, he replaced Stéphane Le Mignan at the head of the Vannes Olympique Club in National. Upon taking office, he failed in his attempt to bring the club back to Ligue 2 before finishing 17th the following season. Following this relegation, the club filed for bankruptcy and he left office. He bounced back at the Créteil-Lusitanos on 7 January 2015, taking over from resigned Philippe Hinschberger with the goal of keeping the club in Ligue 24. The club finished the season in 14th place with 45 points. After a good start to the 2015–16 season, the club was fourth at the end of the 9th round, he went on to have 7 defeats in 9 games including an elimination in the 7th round of the Coupe de France. On 4 December, Froger was laid off. On 5 December 2020 USMA agreed with former club coach Thierry Froger to lead him for one season after a consultation with Yahia and some lead players.

At the beginning of the 2021–22 Djibouti Premier League season, Froger was hired by AS Arta/Solar7 as head coach. Led by Froger, the team won the Premier League and the Djibouti Cup in 2022.

Managerial statistics

References

Living people
1963 births
French footballers
Le Mans FC players
Lille OSC players
Grenoble Foot 38 players
Ligue 1 players
Ligue 2 players
French football managers
Le Mans FC managers
Lille OSC managers
LB Châteauroux managers
FC Gueugnon managers
Stade de Reims managers
Nîmes Olympique managers
Footballers from Le Mans

Association football defenders